Smith Bend is an unincorporated community in Bosque County, in the U.S. state of Texas.

History
The area in what is known as Smith Bend today was first settled by John Jackson Smith, who relocated to the area from Scott County, Mississippi. His oldest son, Burton, moved to the state but died before the rest of his family followed suit. His daughter, Ann, and her husband, Silas McCabe, moved to Smith Bend from South Texas and joined the slaves who came to the area with Burton. They established another community called Coon Creek. It is reported that John Jackson Smith saw the land during a trip as a government guide helping Native Americans in Mississippi move to another territory. After he and his wife, Margaret Butler Smith, died, seven of their children lived the rest of their lives in the community. The youngest, Gip, became a leading rancher and merchant in the area. Smith Bend had 100 residents in 1900 that were mostly tenant farmers. Descendants of the freed slaves left the community. It never prospered beyond a local store. Soon, many farmers had to leave the area during the Great Depression. Farm to Market Road 114 was paved through the community when Lake Whitney opened in 1950 and a bridge was built across the Brazos River. New lakeside businesses contributed to the community's demise, with land being passed onto other hands, and river landmarks such as Twin Rock Bluff, Burks Crossing, and Chalk Bluff, being cut from public access. The Smith Bend-Coon Creek Cemetery, where Burton Smith is buried, has 500 graves. 20 houses are in the community, with half a dozen of those dating from the 1930s or earlier. A gravel processing plant and a pecan orchard dominated the community in 1990.

Geography
Smith Bend is located inside of a meander of the Brazos River, a few miles south of Lake Whitney in southeastern Bosque County.

Education
Since the 1880s, Smith Bend had a school with three teachers employed. It closed in the early 1940s. It was replaced by a Baptist church in 1962 as a meeting place. Today, Smith Bend is served by the Clifton Independent School District.

References

Unincorporated communities in Bosque County, Texas
Unincorporated communities in Texas